Robert "Rob" Baarts (born February 19, 1969 in Surrey, British Columbia) is a retired Canadian soccer forward who is currently the head coach of the New Mexico State University women's soccer team.

College
Rob Baarts grew up in Surrey, British Columbia and attended college at the University of Portland.  He spent four seasons on the Pilot's soccer team under coach Clive Charles.  When he finished his career at Portland, he had 29 goals and 14 assists.  Baarts’ highlight with the Pilots came in 1988 when he, Scott Benedetti and Kasey Keller took Portland to the NCAA Final Four where they lost to eventual champions Indiana University.

Professional
In 1989, he also spent the collegiate off season with the Portland Timbers of the Western Soccer League.  He was tied for seventh on the league's scoring list with seven goals.

Baarts has also played professionally with the Portland Pride of the Continental Indoor Soccer League (CISL), as well as the Portland Pythons and the Utah Freezz, both of the World Indoor Soccer League (WISL).  In 1995, he was a CISL All Star with the Pride.  In 1997, the Edmonton Drillers of the National Professional Soccer League selected Baarts in the dispersal draft after the CISL collapsed.  However, he did not sign with the Drillers.  In 1998, he signed with the Portland Pythons of the Premier Soccer Alliance but he collided with Tatu during an early season game against the Dallas Sidekicks.  The collision resulted in a season-ending injury.  In the spring of 2000, the expansion St. Louis Steamers drafted Baarts, then traded him to the Utah Freezz in exchange for future considerations.  He was the 2000 WISL Defensive Player of the Year.  In 2001, Baarts joined the Portland Timbers of the USL First Division.  However, he was injured after impressing the coaching staff during the pre-season.  The Timbers released him before he played a game with them.

His coaching career began at the youth level with the Portland City United. Baarts coached the boys varsity team at Sunset High School in Beaverton, Ore., from 1991 to 2003. He was the league's coach of the year back-to-back seasons in 2001–02.
 
The active United States Soccer Federation member is an "A" license holder, and has coached multiple youth soccer age division for the FC Portland Academy since 2004.In 2009, Baarts guided both the men's and women's programs into the postseason, and the women's program advanced to the NCAA Quarterfinals for the fourth consecutive year.
 
As an assistant at University of Portland, Baarts was responsible for all recruiting activities, opponent preparation and team travel. In addition, the Portland men's and women's soccer programs have had a 96 percent graduation rate in the last seven years under Baarts' academic progress direction. More than a dozen Pilots which played under Baarts have gone on to play professional soccer. As an assistant, Baarts was responsible for all recruiting activities, opponent preparation and team travel. In addition, the Portland men's and women's soccer programs have had a 96 percent graduation rate in the last seven years under Baarts' academic progress direction. More than a dozen Pilots which played under Baarts have gone on to play professional soccer.

He became an assistant coach and recruiting coordinator at San Jose State in March 2016.

On January 5, 2018, he became the head coach for the women's soccer team at New Mexico State University.

References

External links
 FC Portland bio
 University of Portland bio
 

1969 births
Living people
American soccer coaches
Soccer people from British Columbia
Canadian expatriate sportspeople in the United States
Canadian expatriate soccer players
Canadian soccer coaches
Canadian soccer players
Canadian people of Danish descent
Continental Indoor Soccer League players
Expatriate soccer players in the United States
Association football defenders
Association football midfielders
Sportspeople from Surrey, British Columbia
Portland Pilots men's soccer players
Portland Pride players
Portland Pythons players
Portland Timbers (1985–1990) players
Premier Soccer Alliance players
University of Portland alumni
Utah Freezz players
Western Soccer Alliance players
World Indoor Soccer League players
Portland Timbers (2001–2010) players
Portland Timbers non-playing staff
Portland Pilots men's soccer coaches
High school soccer coaches in the United States
San Jose State Spartans women's soccer coaches
New Mexico State Aggies coaches
Portland Pilots women's soccer coaches